Nueva Valencia, officially the Municipality of Nueva Valencia, is a 3rd class municipality in the province of Guimaras, Philippines. According to the 2020 census, it has a population of 42,771 people.

Its territory includes the islands of Guiwanon (or Guiuanon), Panobolon, as well as numerous other minor islets.

This is the site of the Guimaras oil spill in August 2006, when the oil tanker MT Solar 1 sank a few kilometers from Nueva Valencia.

Nueva Valencia is a part of the Metro Iloilo–Guimaras area, centered on Iloilo City.

Geography

Barangays
Nueva Valencia is politically subdivided into 22 barangays.

Climate

Demographics

Economy

References

External links 
Official webpage of the Province of Guimaras: Nueva Valencia
 [ Philippine Standard Geographic Code]
Philippine Census Information

Municipalities of Guimaras